Paul Henry was a New Zealand morning news and talk show that aired weekdays on Three and was simulcast on Radio Live. Its final lineup consisted of host Paul Henry, news anchor Ingrid Hipkiss, sports anchor Jim Kayes and social media anchor Verity Johnson.

The initial incarnation following Henry's move from TVNZ to MediaWorks was a late night news program entitled The Paul Henry Show, which debuted on 27 January 2014 on Three (formally TV3) to replace the former late night news show Nightline. Mediaworks announced the show was going to move into the morning timeslot in late 2014 and was replaced by Newsworthy.

Paul Henry resigned from his morning post in November 2016, and last aired on 16 December 2016. It was replaced by The AM Show in February 2017, hosted by Duncan Garner.

Presenters

Anchors

News anchor

Sports anchor

Social media presenter

Backup presenters

Anchor
Alison Mau
Mark Sainsbury

Newsreader
Judy Bailey
Sacha McNeil
Amanda Gillies

Sports anchor
Jeff McTainsh
Melodie Robinson

Social media presenter
Aziz Al-Saafin
Gracie Taylor

History

The Paul Henry Show
The Paul Henry Show premiered on 27 January 2014 from 10:35 p.m. to 11:15 p.m. with Paul Henry as the show's host, and Janika ter Ellen as the news anchor, with Fiona McMillan as the show's executive producer. Labour Party leader David Cunliffe and Prime Minister John Key were both interviewed on the episode.

Henry kicked off the interview with Cunliffe by stating "I'd never vote for you", and teased Cunliffe on his misspelling of Lorde on Twitter, as Cunliffe spelt it as "Lord" when he tweeted congratulating her on her Grammy Awards. Key only managed to name three native New Zealand birds in the '9 in 10' challenge, where participants have to answer a question with 9 answers in 10 seconds. Henry asked Key to name native New Zealand birds, with Key naming tui, kiwi, kakapo, and "some kind of pigeon".

At the end of 2014 an announcement was made that Paul Henry will move to presenting a morning news show and as a result this marked the end for The Paul Henry Show. The final show aired on 19 December 2014. The replacement evening show called Newsworthy replaced the late night show.

Paul Henry
The new breakfast show presented by Paul Henry first aired 7 April 2015. The new breakfast show is broadcast live from a purpose-built hybrid radio/television studio at MediaWorks’ Flower Street offices. It replaced both Firstline on TV3 and the breakfast show on RadioLIVE. It's New Zealand's first cross-platformed show.

The morning show, entitled Paul Henry, is hosted by Paul Henry, Ingrid Hipkiss, Verity Johnson and Jim Kayes. The show covers local and international news, including sport, weather and much more. The show airs across TV3, RadioLIVE, mobile devices and the internet and is broadcast weekdays 6am-9am. On the first episode, Paul was joined by Prime Minister John Key, Kiwi musician Brooke Fraser and Rocket Lab founder Glenn Martin.

Studio
Both versions of the show broadcast from TV3's Flower Street headquarters from studio 3 which was refitted between the late night show ending and the morning show beginning, the morning edition studio was designed by Jago Design who also designed the main Newshub studio in 2016, Studio 3 was home to Ice TV.

References

External links
Website

2010s New Zealand television series
2014 New Zealand television series debuts
2016 New Zealand television series endings
New Zealand television news shows
Three (TV channel) original programming
Breakfast television in New Zealand